Chakothi is a border village in the Hattian Bala District of Azad Kashmir, Pakistan.

Chakothi is the check post to Muzaffarabad-Srinagar bus service for immigration and customs.

References

Populated places in Jhelum Valley District